Slaine Kelly (born 9 July 1982) is an Irish television and film actress. Her first role was on the Irish short film Ouch directed by Ken Wardrop. She then went on to play a small part in George directed by Rory Bresnihan & John Butler the short stars Amy Huberman and Hugh O'Conor. Both shorts won a nomination for the Best Short Fiction Award at the Irish Film and Television Awards in 2005.
She is best known for her role as Jane Howard in The Tudors.

Career
Kelly has had roles in several Irish comedy shorts, including Mebollix directed by Simon Gibney, The Bet directed by Philip Lewis with Paddy C. Courtney in the lead role in both films.

She played the lead in the Barry's Tea commercial filmed in Ireland and Thailand. The 60 second commercial was directed by British Academy Television Award winning director Declan Lowney.

Kelly starred in the February 2009 Music video for British indie-pop band New Rhodes which was directed by Matthias Hoene.

Kelly featured in the short film Missed Connections, which was the winner of the Best Mid-Length Film award at the Zero Film Festival in New York City, in November 2010.

She played the role of Suzie in Koda, which screened at the Rushes Soho Short Festival, London, Los Angeles International Short Film Festival, Los Angeles and The Oldenburg Film festival, Germany. Koda stars Jenny Agutter and Michael Maloney.

Kelly also plays a young Anarchists in British horror Psychosis directed by Reg Traviss.

Filmography

Film

Television

References

External links
 

Irish television actresses
Irish film actresses
1982 births
Living people